The 2013 Men's EuroHockey Championship III was the 5th edition of the men's EuroHockey Championship III, the third level of the European field hockey championships organized by the European Hockey Federation.

It was held from 12 to 18 August 2013 in Lausanne, Switzerland. The tournament also served as a qualifier for the 2015 Men's EuroHockey Championship II, with the finalists qualifying.

Qualified teams
The following eight teams, shown with pre-tournament world rankings, will competed in the tournament.

Results
All times are local (UTC+2).

Preliminary round

Pool A

Pool B

Fifth to eighth place classification

Pool C
The points obtained in the preliminary round against the other team are taken over.

First to fourth place classification

Semi-finals

Third and fourth place

Final

Final standings

 Promoted to the EuroHockey Championship II

 Relegated to the EuroHockey Championship IV

References

EuroHockey Championship III
International field hockey competitions hosted by Switzerland
Men 3
EuroHockey Championship III Men
EuroHockey Championship III Men
Sports competitions in Lausanne
21st century in Lausanne